The Solent is a stretch of sea separating the Isle of Wight from Great Britain.

Solent may also refer to:

 HMS Solent, two ships of the British Royal Navy
 PS Solent, three passenger vessels of the London and South Western Railway
 River Solent, an extinct river in the area of the coastlines of Hampshire and the Isle of Wight
 The Short Solent, often simply called a Solent, a type of flying boat
 Solent City, an alternate name for South Hampshire
 Solent Group, a geological group in the Hampshire Basin of southern England
 Solent University, a university in Southampton, England
 Solent (sailing rig)

See also